This tournament should not be confused with the "King of Europe Tournament", held in 2006 by the Austrian wrestling promotion Rings of Europe.
The King of Europe Cup (KOE cup) is a European professional wrestling tournament in the style of the "King of Indies" and "Super 8" tournaments of the United States.

The inaugural event was hosted in Liverpool, England on the last weekend of April 2007 and was the brainchild of two UK wrestling veterans Alex Shane and Doug Williams. In what was considered a historic event in British wrestling history, the first event featured a tournament to crown the first KOE cup holder and involved 16 promotions and wrestlers from across the world.

Interactive aspects

The following ideas were advertised on the web-site prior to the tournament, but were not implemented.

Prize fighting
For the first time in modern British wrestling, fans were given the opportunity to make voluntary donations for match of the night. This money was then added to a £1000 match of the night cash prize which was donated by event organizers, giving £500 a night for the best match on each day. Fans were given score sheets at the start of the show and were asked to put their top three matches from that night in order. The votes were collected and the three matches with the most votes were decided. The fan donated money was then added to the $1000 prize fund giving grand cash reward.

The participants who fans selected to have the best 3 matches each night then received the prize money at the end of each night with 55% for 1st prize, 35% for second, and 10% for third prize, improving the earnings of the wrestlers who give fans the best matches.

Match suggestions
At the end of night one, fans were asked upon leaving to select two matches using the eliminated 8 wrestlers from round one. Once again these suggestions were collected and the matches with the most audience votes were made for the following evening.

King of Europe 2007

Promotions

"Taste of IPW:UK" pre-show
Several matches from the UK promotion took place on the afternoon card before the tournament matches in the evening of both dates. The two-hour pre-shows were billed as containing no interval, but due to travel problems for Rhino the day one pre-show actually had two intervals. These pre-shows gave one of the UK’s fastest growing independent companies a chance to be seen in front of their largest audience ever.

Afternoon One (April 28)

Rhino vs. Martin Stone ended in a no contest when The Untouchables interfered.

2 Out Of 3 Falls Match: Pac defeated El Generico.
 Pac won the first fall by pinfall with a cradle.
 El Generico won the second fall by pinfall after a brainbuster.
 Pac won the third and final fall by pinfall after a modified Dragonrana.

IPW:UK World Title Match: Andy Boy Simmonz defeated Spud by pinfall with the Simulation.

Dragon Phoenix defeated Claudio Castagnoli by pinfall with a roll-up.

The Untouchables (Jack Storm & Dave Moralez) defeated Blok-Busta and C-Juice by pinfall with a powerbomb/flying clothesline combination.

Afternoon Two (April 29)

IPW:UK Tag Title Match: Swiss Money Holding (Claudio Castagnoli & Ares) (c) defeated The Dragon Hearts (Spud & Dragon Phoenix) by pinfall to retain the IPW:UK Tag Team Titles after a double-team backbreaker on Phoenix.

Martin Stone defeated Zebra Kid by pinfall with a strong-arm lariat.

IPW:UK World Title Match: Andy Boy Simmonz (c) defeated Blok-Busta by submission to retain the title.

Dragon Aisu defeated C-Juice by pinfall with a headlock DDT.

The Untouchables (Jack Storm & Dave Moralez) defeated EntouRAGE (Mark Sloan & Ollie Burns) by pinfall with a powerbomb/flying clothesline combination.

Tournament
16 wrestlers, chosen or qualified from sixteen separate promotions around the country, faced off in a single-elimination two-night tournament, to ultimately crown the first King of Europe cupholder.

Qualified by/Other notes
1 Chris Hero was hand-picked by CZW owner John Zandig.
² Claudio Castagnoli defeated Mike Quackenbush to qualify.
³ Are$ qualified for the wXw spot after winning wXw's point system which saw any wrestler scoring a direct pinfall over another wrestler during one of wXw's shows was awarded one point; and whoever scored three points first would represent wXw in both this tournament and their own 16 Carat Gold Tournament. As the promotion is based on the pure effect of the sport, points are not given for a DQ, Countount, Draw or even if your tag team partner scores the fall. Wrestlers are unable to lose the points.
4 Matt Sydal was chosen by IWA:MS to represent the company.
5 IWS's representative was decided at their "Praise the Violence" show on January 20, where El Generico won a three-way dance involving Jagged and Kid Kamikaze, and was named the official IWS representative for both the King of Europe Cup and for wXw's 16 Karat Gold tournament.
6 RQW representative Martin Stone secured his spot by being the winner of the one-night RQW Heavyweight title tournament from London’s York Hall on December 16, 2006.
7PWG representative Davey Richards won the right to represent the company by defeating a veteran of the 2006 16 Carat Gold Tournament, Rocky "Azucar" Romero, in a Double Tournament Qualifying Match (winning entry in both tournaments) at their Passive Hostility! event on December 2. 
8 WAW representative Zebra Kid is the son of WAW owner Ricky Knight. 
9 Though involved with the pre-show, IPW:UK were not originally scheduled to enter a wrestler into the tournament. However, this was changed in February 2007 when it was revealed that IPW:UK would in fact be entering Pac.
10 Trent Acid won the right to represent PWU by pinning Gary Wolfe in a qualifying match on March 14. 

Prior to the final of the tournament there was a 6-Man Elimination Match
Martin Stone, Atsushi Aoki & El Generico defeated Trent Acid, Are$ & Claudio Castagnoli

Title history

References

External links
KingofEuropeCup.com (official site)

Professional wrestling shows
Professional wrestling tournaments
Events in Liverpool
2007 in professional wrestling
2007 in England